Robert P. Robinson (May 15, 1884 – December 26, 1953) was a member of the Wisconsin State Senate from the 15th District (Rock County).

Biography
Robinson was born on May 15, 1884 in Beloit, Wisconsin. During World War I, he served in the United States Army. He received his degree from Beloit College and was in the advertising business. He died on December 26, 1953.

Political career
Robinson served on the school board and the Beloit Common Council. He was a member of the Senate from 1943 until his death. He was a Republican.

References

External links
The Political Graveyard

Politicians from Beloit, Wisconsin
Beloit College alumni
School board members in Wisconsin
Wisconsin city council members
Republican Party Wisconsin state senators
Businesspeople from Wisconsin
Military personnel from Wisconsin
United States Army personnel of World War I
1884 births
1953 deaths
20th-century American politicians
20th-century American businesspeople